J.P. Coleman State Park is a state park in the U.S. state of Mississippi. The park is named for James P. Coleman, a former governor of Mississippi.

Activities and amenities
The park features boating, waterskiing and fishing for smallmouth bass on  Pickwick Lake, primitive and developed campsites, cabins, cottages, motel, swimming pool, visitors center, picnic area, and a miniature golf course.

References

External links
 at Mississippi Department of Fisheries, Wildlife, and Parks

State parks of Mississippi
Protected areas of Tishomingo County, Mississippi